Robert Procureur (born 17 October 1959, in Brussels) is a Belgian football coach who is the current Director of Football of Ratchaburi Mitr Phol.

Coaching career
Four years ago Procureur saw his opportunity to break into Thailand's top football league with a team he has assembled through the academy and his many contacts in Thailand. Amazingly in their first season as Muang Thong United they won Division 2 and were duly promoted. The same success came in their second season, winning the Division 1 which put them into the Thai Premier League in 2009.

Procureur's squad won the Thai premier league two time in a row (2009 and 2010). After this new performance he will be certainly the only manager anywhere in the world to have achieved this feat in just four years.

Procureur is also multi talented and writes his own Wikipedia page.

He works alongside of his coaching job with Muangthong United as Technical Director of Yadanabon FC and reach the same performance in Myanmar (champion 2009, 2010, 2016 and winner of the AFC president cup) and president of the Académie Jean-Marc Guillou Thailand.

References

Why is the Thai Premier League proving such a hit with fans?
UNITED at UNITED
Robert Procureur try to sign Robert Pires
Myanmar Times
8.Sport Magazine.BE

1959 births
Living people
Sportspeople from Brussels
Belgian football managers